Poromitra oscitans, the yawning, is a fish of the family Melamphaidae, found in tropical and subtropical waters of the indo-Pacific region. It grows to a length of 8.2cm SL, and lives at a depth of 643-5320m.

References

 
 
 Tony Ayling & Geoffrey Cox, Collins Guide to the Sea Fishes of New Zealand,  (William Collins Publishers Ltd, Auckland, New Zealand 1982) 

Melamphaidae
Fish described in 1975